Lecanora caesiorubella is a species of crustose lichen in the family Lecanoraceae.

See also
List of Lecanora species

References

Lichens described in 1810
Lichen species
Lichens of North America
caesiorubella
Taxa named by Erik Acharius